The Collège Calvin, formerly the Collège de Genève, is the oldest public secondary school in Geneva, Switzerland. It was founded in 1559 by John Calvin.

History

In it was taught the liberal arts and university studies, which Genevan people had previously had to go abroad to study. After the Protestant Reformation, school was made obligatory and free for poor people on May 21, 1536. A new college was founded, this time in the Franciscan convent.

It was not until May 29, 1559, after the Leges Academiae Genevensis (Order of Collège de Genève) that work began on the actual building of a new  official Collège de Genève and Université de Genève. This building would eventually house the Collège de Genève alone. The original edifice is now part of a complex, with a wing added in the Renaissance, another wing and building in the 19th century, and a final building added in 1987. The Collège de Genève was renamed the Collège Calvin in 1969, after its founder, the French Protestant reformer John Calvin.

System
The Collège Calvin is one of the Postobligatory Secondary Education Schools in Geneva, specifically 
under the Formation Gymnasiale collèges. Students who want to pursue an education past the (obligatory) Cycle d'Orientation enter the four-year college from 15 to 19.

Notable alumni
 Joseph Baskin
 Marc Bonnant
 Jorge Luis Borges
 : Les trois demoiselles du père Maire, Le centenaire de Jean Jacques, L'école du dimanche
 Henry Dunant
 Barbara Hofmann
 Philippe Monnier: Le livre de Blaise
 Gustave Moynier
 Marcel Junod
 Didier Pittet
 Jan A. Rajchman (1911-1989)
 Ferdinand de Saussure (1857-1913)
 Jean Starobinski
 Rodolphe Töpffer (1799-1846)
 Andrew Le Mercier (1692-1764)
 Augustin Pyramus de Candolle (1778-1841)

References

External links

Official Collège Calvin Website. 
History of the Collège. 
Geneva Postobligatory Secondary Education. 

Schools in Geneva
Educational institutions established in the 1550s
1559 establishments in Europe